The Delaware State Police (DSP) is a division of the Delaware Department of Public Safety and Homeland Security and is responsible for traffic regulation and law enforcement across the state of Delaware, especially in areas underserved by local police departments. The DSP is headquartered in the capital Dover, Delaware.

History
Before the Delaware State Police was formed in 1923, the first traffic law enforcement officers were called the "Highway Traffic Police". Started in 1919, the HTP consisted of one officer whose sole function was to patrol the Philadelphia Pike near Wilmington.  In the following year the force was increased to three men and three motorcycles.  From 1920 to 1923 these men served directly under the State Highway Commission. Prior to the formation of state police the areas between unincorporated districts were served by the county sheriff department.

Thoughts on the topic of forming a State Police organization for the First State had been recorded as early as 1906.  Although interest existed, little, if any, positive steps were taken until the State Highway Commission was formed in 1917.  As construction of paved highways was begun and registered motor vehicles began to rise, a need to regulate and maintain safety soon became apparent.  On April 23, 1923, the General Assembly, at the request of the State Highway Department, enacted two laws that created the Delaware State Police. This date marks the official organization of the present law enforcement organization.

The Delaware State Police currently employs 723 full-time officers, which is 75 troopers for every 100,000 residents in 2019, the largest number of any state police force.

Troops
Currently, the DSP operates out of eight barracks known as "Troops", not including Headquarters.  Each county has one troop that is shared between patrol (Uniformed) and detective (CIU) units. Delaware State Police investigate over 33,000 criminal complaints yearly.

Troop 1 – Penny Hill (near Claymont), New Castle County (Patrol Only)
 A sub-station of Troop 1, called Troop 1A, was located on the grounds of the Brandywine Town Center in the Brandywine Hundred section of New Castle County. It is now closed.
Troop 2 – Bear, New Castle County (Shared by Patrol, C.I.U., G.T.F. and New Castle County C.R.U.)
Troop 3 – Rising Sun, Kent County (Shared by Patrol, C.I.U., G.T.F. and Kent County C.R.U.)
Troop 4 – Georgetown, Sussex County (Shared by Patrol, C.I.U. and G.T.F.)
Troop 5 – Bridgeville, Sussex County (Patrol Only)
Troop 6 – Prices Corner (near Elsmere), New Castle County (Patrol Only)
Troop 7 – Lewes, Sussex County (Patrol & Sussex County CRU)
Troop 9 – Odessa, New Castle County (Patrol Only)

C.I.U. - Criminal Investigative Unit

G.T.F. - Governor's Task Force

C.R.U. - Crash Reconstruction Unit

Counties
In Kent and Sussex Counties, the Delaware State Police serve as the primary law-enforcement agency that are not incorporated into municipalities who have their own law enforcement agency.

In New Castle County, the Delaware State Police shares primary jurisdiction with the New Castle County Police.  The 1974 jurisdictional agreement between DSP and NCCPD states the New Castle County Police investigates complaints in residences or commercial areas located on county roads or community streets.  The Delaware State Police investigates complaints in residences or commercial areas located on state roads or interstate highways. However, in an emergency incident, the closest New Castle County Police officer or Delaware State Police trooper will respond no matter where the complaint originates from.

Units/sections
Like other state police agencies, the Delaware State Police has several sub-divisions specializing in addressing particular crimes or security needs.

Full-time units
 Aviation Unit (North & South Hangars)
 Canine Unit
 Collision Reconstruction Unit
 Commercial Motor Vehicle Enforcement Unit
 Community Outreach Unit
 Criminal Investigations Units (Robbery, Burglary, Financial Crimes, Major Crimes, Domestic Violence & Youth Aid Detectives) 
 Drug Unit
 Evidence Detection Unit
 Executive Protection Unit
 Firearms Training Unit
 Gaming Enforcement Unit
 Governor's Task Force
 High Technology Crimes Unit
 Homeland Security
 Homicide Unit
 Inspections/Accreditation Unit
 Intelligence Unit
 Internal Affairs
 Maritime Unit
 Polygraph Unit
 Public Information Office
 Planning Section
 Recruiting Unit
 School Resource Officer
 Sex Offender Apprehension & Registration Unit
 Special Operations Response Team (10 Full-Time Members)
 State Bureau of Identification
 Training Academy
 Traffic Section

Part-time units
 Conflict Management Team
 Explosive Ordnance Disposal
 Honor Guard Unit
 Motor Unit
 Mounted Patrol Unit
 Pipes & Drums Unit
 Scuba Team (Water Operations & Recovery)
 Special Operations Response Team (Part-Time Members from across the state outside of the 10 Full-Time Members)
 Tactical Control Unit

Special units
The DSP also operates several special units/locations around the state, including aviation units in Georgetown and Middletown, and weigh stations on U.S. Rt. 13 and U.S. Rt. 301.

9-1-1 dispatch centers
Additionally, the Delaware State Police also provides 9-1-1 dispatch center services in all 3 counties for both DSP and any municipal agencies which do not have their own dispatcher.  RECOM is for New Castle County, KENTCOM is for Kent County, and SUSCOM is for Sussex County. The New Castle County Police and several of the larger city police provide their own dispatch services.

Division of Gaming Enforcement

The Division of Gaming Enforcement is responsible for enforcing state laws relating to gaming that occur in a licensed video lottery facility, or which relate the operation of the Delaware Lottery.

The Casino Background Investigators are responsible for background checks on staff involved in gambling, and the Criminal Investigations and Intelligence team, which includes 8 state troopers and an agent from the Delaware Division of Alcohol and Tobacco Enforcement, investigates gaming crime and develops intelligence on criminal activity in relation to gaming and gambling. In 2019, 361 complaints were investigated by the Division.

Uniforms and equipment

Since the 1950s, members of the DSP have worn uniforms more similar to the state's colors of "blue and gold".  In the past, DSP used military-type colors of navy and green.

The most distinctive uniform is the "Class A Dress" uniform consisting of a navy blue military dress coat with French blue shoulder epaulets and sleeve cuffs.  The long sleeve uniform shirt is French blue in color with a navy blue tie.  The DSP patch with bears the great seal of Delaware is worn on the left arm of all uniform items.  The trooper's rank is worn on both sleeves.  The trooper's years of service "hash-marks" are worn on the lower part of the left arm.  The trooper's badge is worn over the left pocket and the nameplate, along with any awards, over the right pocket.  A matching French blue color trouser with a 2-inch gold stripe on the legs is worn with black leather knee-high riding boots.  This was the standard everyday uniform in the past.  However, it is now worn for special events only.

The standard winter uniform, worn between November and April, is the same as the "Class A Dress" uniform, except that the military dress coat is replaced with a standard patrol jacket.  The knee-high boots are replaced with shoes, however some troopers still wear the boots.

The standard summer uniform, worn between April and November, is the same as the winter uniform, except the long sleeve shirt is replaced with a short sleeve shirt and it is worn without the tie. During the summer months the color of the uniform trouser changes from French blue to navy blue with the same 2-inch gold stripe.

DSP troopers wear a navy blue campaign hat with the state seal.  Prior to the 1950s, they wore a tan cavalry-style hat like those worn by Maryland troopers.

Troopers holding the rank of lieutenant and above wear gold badges, nameplates, and collar rank.  They are also permitted to wear a white color shirt in place of the French blue shirt, but this has fallen out of practice in recent years.

The DSP duty belt is Gould & Goodrich plain black leather with a Safariland "raptor level-3" holster.  The ammo pouch, OC spray holder, and handcuff case have silver snaps (gold for lieutenant and above).  The portable radio and ASP baton is also worn on the duty belt.  A shoulder strap is used with the "Class A Dress" uniform, otherwise standard belt keepers are used.  It is DSP policy that all duty belts are to be worn the same way, so troopers can not remove or add any equipment to the duty belt.

Best dressed

In 2005, the Delaware State Police were named the "best-dressed state law enforcement agency" according to the National Association of Uniform Manufacturers.

Rank structure

Firearms
Delaware State Troopers are issued the Sig Sauer P229 DAK chambered for .357 SIG. Patrol rifles were updated in 2012 when the State Police purchased the SIG Sauer SIG516.  The Remington 870 is the standard issue patrol shotgun.,

Fallen officers
Since the establishment of the Highway Traffic Police in 1919, the predecessor to the Delaware State Police, 19 officers have died while on duty, the most recent being April 26, 2017.

See also

 List of law enforcement agencies in Delaware
 Delaware Capitol Police
State Police (United States)
State Patrol
Highway Patrol

References

External links
 Website
 History of the DSP

Police
State law enforcement agencies of Delaware
Government agencies established in 1923
1923 establishments in Delaware